The Helicopters were a South African pop rock band active in the 1980s. They formed in 1981 in Vereeniging and were stylistically similar to the new wave bands Duran Duran and A Flock of Seagulls. Benjy Mudie signed the group to Warner Bros. Records in 1984, where they released one album and several singles; in 1987 they moved to Epic and released a second full-length before disbanding. The band scored several hit singles in South Africa, including "Mysteries and Jealousy". The group was a popular concert draw, able to fill stadiums in its home country.

After the band's breakup, lead singer Bernard Binns moved to England, where he has released several solo albums.

Discography
Albums
Love Attack (1985, WEA)
Mysteries and Jealousies — 4:15
In Love — 3:32
Don't Vanish, It's a Love Attack — 3:33
Night Vision Girl — 3:46
Say That Again — 2:56
Come and Dance — 3:26
Kissing For Pleasure — 3:40
Only For You — 4:05
Miles Apart — 4:45
Chased — 3:11

In the Flesh (1987, Epic)
Television — 6:14
Western Skies — 4:46
In the Flesh — 4:43
Hi-Tech Man — 3:42
Whisper Your Secret — 4:34
Terror in the Attic — 5:27
Yesterday Was Never — 4:16
Television Part II — 1:04

What Affair EP (1988, Gallo)
The Best of The Helicopters (2002, RetroFresh)

Singles
"Flying High" (Klingel, 1981)
"Mysteries and Jealousy" (Warner, 1984)
"Miles and Miles Apart" (Warner, 1984)
"Kissing For Pleasure" (Warner, 1984)
"Only for You" (Warner, 1985)
"Come and Dance" (Warner, 1985)
"I Wanna Live in Hollywood" (Warner, 1986)
"Whisper Your Secret" (1987, Epic)

References

External links
Discography

New wave groups
South African rock music groups